Konstantios & Evripidis Trachoniou is a Cypriot football club based in Trachoni, Cyprus. Founded in 1960 was playing 1 season in Third and 5 seasons in Fourth Division.

References

Football clubs in Cyprus
Association football clubs established in 1966
1966 establishments in Cyprus